Banco de Crédito del Perú is the largest bank and the largest supplier of integrated financial services in Perú with approximately US$39 billion in total assets and a market share of 30.4% in total loans and 33.5% in total deposits.

Operations
BCP has more than 133 years of presence in the country and represents Peru's most valuable brand. Its network of more than 8,340 points of contact serves its more than 6 million clients. BCP is the main subsidiary of Credicorp (NYSE: BAP), the largest financial holding in Peru.

BCP's Wholesale Banking competes with local and foreign banks and provides its customers with short and medium-term loans in local and foreign currencies, foreign trade-related financing, lease financing, underwriting and financial advisory. Its currently the market leader with a market share of more than 40% in corporate loans.

BCP's Retail Banking serves individuals and small-sized companies with a wide range of high value-proposition products with a market share of over 20%. In addition, BCP is the largest capital market and brokerage distribution system in Peru; its main activities include asset management, foreign exchange transactions, treasury, custody and trust, investment advisory services, and research activities.

History

Banco de Crédito del Perú (BCP), was founded by a group of Italian-Peruvian businessmen on April 9, 1889, and called during its first 52 years "Banco Italiano" ("Italian Bank"), adopting a credit policy based on the principles that would guide institutional behavior in the future. On February 1, 1942, it was agreed to replace the old corporate name to Banco de Crédito del Perú.

In order to achieve greater international presence, BCP opened branches in Nassau and New York, which made it the only Peruvian Bank present in two of the most important financial centers of the world. The expansion of BCP's activities created the need for a new headquarter for central management. To that end, a building of 30,000 m2 approximately was built in the district of La Molina (In 2004 the Miami chapter of the American Institute of Architects awarded the Banco de Crédito headquarters building the AIA Test of Time Award.). Then, with the aim of improving its services, BCP established the National Network of Tele Process, which in late 1988 connected almost every office in the country with the central computer of Lima. Also, the Current and Savings Account National Book was created and an extensive network of ATMs was installed.

In 2010, BCP acquired Edyficar, a micro-finance company in Peru. Later, in 2014, Edyficar bought and merged with Mibanco, which made it the leader in the micro-lending business in the Peruvian Financial System.

Walter Bayly Llona served as CEO from 2008 to 2018.

References

External links
 Official Website

1889 establishments in Peru
Banks of Peru
Banks established in 1889
Peruvian brands